The Church of the Immaculate Conception, also known as the Spanish Church or La Purísima, is a Roman Catholic church built in 1880-1881 in Tangier, Morocco.

Overview

The church is located on Rue Es-Siaghine, just west of the Petit Socco square at the center of the Tangier medina. It stands on the former ground of the Swedish legation, which had been established there in 1788. It was designed by architect  on the initiative of Spanish Franciscan father . It was complemented in 1892-93 by the edification of a clock tower, originally topped with a spire and later changed to the present-day cupola. The church initially served the whole city's Catholic community, including European diplomats. 

More recently, the property has been used by the Missionaries of Charity who in 1996 altered its interior, partitioning the former church nave into two floors.

See also
 Roman Catholic Cathedral of Tangier
 French Church of Tangier

References

External links

 

Roman Catholic churches in Morocco
Churches in Tangier
Tourist attractions in Tangier
1880s establishments in Morocco
19th-century architecture in Morocco